The Liberal Party is a United Kingdom political party that was founded in 1989 by members of the original Liberal Party opposed to its merger with the Social Democratic Party (SDP) to form the Liberal Democrats. To date (2021) the party has never held a UK, Scottish, Senedd or European parliamentary seat, though it has had representation on local councils.

Parliamentary elections contested

By-elections 1987–1992

1992 general election

By-elections 1992–1997

1997 general election
Source: UK General Election Results 1997 at politicsresources.net

By-elections 1997–2001

2001 general election

2005 general election

2010 general election

2015 general election

2017 general election

2019 general election

References

Election results by party in the United Kingdom